Fernando Cabrera (born April 18, 1964) is an American politician in the Bronx, New York. A Democrat, he formerly represented the 14th district in the New York City Council, including the neighborhoods of Claremont Village, Fordham, Kingsbridge, Marble Hill, Morris Heights, Mount Eden, Mount Hope, and University Heights.

Cabrera is a socially conservative Democrat. He is an opponent of abortion and opposes same-sex marriage.

Early life and education
Cabrera was born in the Bronx to a Dominican father and Puerto Rican mother. He received a B.A. in Religion from Southern California College, a M.A. in Counseling from Liberty University, and a Doctorate in Education from Argosy University.

Career
In 2009, Cabrera challenged Maria Baez to a primary election for the Democratic nomination for 14th district in the Bronx. With the backing of The Bronx Democratic Committee and the endorsement of key unions, Cabrera was able to defeat the incumbent by just over 1% difference in three-way race that included Yudelka Tapia. Cabrera followed that by winning the general election against Republican Yessenia A. Duran and Conservative Lisa Marie Campbell. He won reelection in 2013.

In 2014, Cabrera challenged Senator Gustavo Rivera in the Democratic primary, but lost 59% to 41%. During his primary bid against Rivera, Cabrera attracted ire for his opposition to abortion & gay marriage, as well as his apparent praise of an anti-gay Ugandan law. In a video posted on Youtube and later deleted, Cabrera, speaking from Uganda, said, "Gay marriage is not accepted in this country. Why? Because the Christians have assumed the place of decision-making for the nation."

Cabrera challenged Rivera again in 2016, but lost by a larger margin, 63% to 37%.

On September 12, 2017, Cabrera won 55% of the vote in the New York Democratic Primary election, to 35% for challenger Randy Abreu and 10% for Felix Perdomo.

On January 11, 2018, Cabrera was elected Majority Whip and Chairman of the Committee on Governmental Operations.

In 2019, Cabrera announced that he was going to challenge Alexandria Ocasio-Cortez in the Democratic Primary for New York's 14th congressional district, while criticizing her embracing of democratic socialism. On March 1, 2020, Cabrera announced that he was ending his primary bid against Ocasio-Cortez and that he would instead be running for the position of Bronx Borough President in 2021.

Cabrera lost this borough president race to Vanessa Gibson, the then-chair of the council's Committee on Public Safety. She is the first woman to hold the position of Bronx borough president.

In February 2022, after New York City mayor Eric Adams named Cabrera a senior advisor in the city's  Office of Faith-Based and Community Partnerships, LGBT groups objected to the appointment, citing Cabrera's history of opposing same-sex marriage.

Personal life
Cabrera is the senior pastor of New Life Outreach International in the Kingsbridge area of the Bronx. He is a former program director for the Mental Health and Counseling program at Mercy College.

References

External links
NYC Council District 14

1964 births
American politicians of Dominican Republic descent
Puerto Rican people in New York (state) politics
Argosy University alumni
Living people
New York City Council members
Hispanic and Latino American New York City Council members
New York (state) Democrats
Politicians from the Bronx
New York (state) Republicans
Candidates in the 2021 United States elections
21st-century American politicians